The Franklin O-805 (company designation 12AC) was an American air-cooled aircraft piston engine, designed in the mid-1940s and was to be used in radio-controlled pilotless drones that were to be guided from an accompanying control plane. Due to project requirement changes and cancellations the engine was not produced.

A smaller displacement 12-cylinder Franklin engine of 1941 was known as the O-595 or 12AC-596.

Variants

O-805
12AC-8060
12ACG-806 (XO-805-1) at 3,200 rpm, geared to 0.632:1.
12ACGSA-806 (XO-805-3 and O-805-5) at 3,200 rpm, supercharged and geared to 0.632:1 (XO-805-3), or to 0.587:1 (O-805-5).

O-595
12AC-596 at 2,600 rpm

12ACG-596 at 3,500 rpm

Applications (intended)
 Interstate XBQ-5
 Interstate XTD2R-1

Survivors
 There is an O-805-2 on display at the New England Air Museum, Bradley International Airport, Windsor Locks, CT 
 One surfaced and was sold privately in August, 2016, on eBay for US$8500.

Specifications (12ACGSA-806/XO-805-3)

See also

References
Notes

External links

A table showing the relationship of the military models

1940s aircraft piston engines
Franklin aircraft engines